is a train station in Uji, Kyoto Prefecture, Japan, operated by West Japan Railway Company (JR West). It has the station number "JR-D11".

Lines
Shinden Station is served by the Nara Line.

Layout
The station consists of two side platforms serving two tracks. The station building is on platform 1. There is an overpass between the two platforms. The station does not have a Midori no Madoguchi ticket window, but a POS terminal. From this station, the Nara Line has double tracks in direction for Kyoto, and a single track in direction for Nara.

Platforms

Passenger statistics
According to the Kyoto Prefecture statistical report, the average number of passengers per day is as follows.

History 
The station opened on January 25, 1896. The Kansai Railway was nationalised on October 1, 1907. After the privatization of Japanese National Railways (JNR) on April 1, 1987, the station came under the control of JR West. The IC card ticket "ICOCA" can be used since 1 November 2003. Station numbering was introduced in March 2018 with Shinden being assigned station number JR-D11.

Adjacent stations

Surrounding area
 Okubo Station on the Kintetsu Kyoto Line

References

External links

  

Railway stations in Kyoto Prefecture